Trina Periša, married Tanasilović (born 15 November 1984 in Šibenik, SFR Yugoslavia) is a Croatian female professional basketball player.

External links
Profile at eurobasket.com
Profile at ISM agency site

1984 births
Living people
Basketball players from Šibenik
Croatian women's basketball players
Centers (basketball)
ŽKK Šibenik players
Mediterranean Games bronze medalists for Croatia
Mediterranean Games medalists in basketball
Competitors at the 2009 Mediterranean Games